"If You Were with Me Now" is a song written by British songwriting team Mike Stock and Pete Waterman, Australian pop singer Kylie Minogue, and American R&B singer Keith Washington for Minogue's fourth studio album, Let's Get to It (1991). The song was produced by Stock and Waterman. The song was released as the second single in October 1991 and reached number four on the UK Singles Chart, as well as the top 10 in Ireland and the top 30 in Australia. The song is Minogue's first hit single to feature her as a co-writer.

Both Minogue and Washington recorded their vocals separately at PWL's studio in London; the two did not meet until the music video filming. At no moment of the video do they appear together, and there are no obvious signs that the scenes of each of them were recorded at the same location.

Critical reception
Digital Spy's Nick Levine called the track a "slushy duet". Writing Minogue's biography for her special on Australian music video programme Rage, they called the song one of the "richly beautiful ballads".

Track listings
Australian and UK CD single
 "If You Were with Me Now" – 3:10
 "I Guess I Like It Like That" – 5:59
 "If You Were with Me Now" (extended version) – 5:06

Australian and UK cassette single, UK 7-inch single
 "If You Were with Me Now" – 3:10
 "I Guess I Like It Like That" – 3:30

UK 12-inch single
 "If You Were with Me Now" – 5:06
 "I Guess I Like It Like That" – 5:59

Charts

Weekly charts

Year-end charts

References

1991 singles
1991 songs
Keith Washington songs
Kylie Minogue songs
Male–female vocal duets
Mushroom Records singles
Pete Waterman Entertainment singles
Songs written by Keith Washington
Songs written by Kylie Minogue
Songs written by Mike Stock (musician)
Songs written by Pete Waterman